The 1976 Texas Tech Red Raiders football team represented Texas Tech University as a member of the Southwest Conference (SWC) during the 1976 NCAA Division I football season. Led by second-year head coach Steve Sloan, the Red Raiders compiled an overall record of 10–2 with a mark of 7–1 in conference playing sharing the SWC title with Houston. Texas Tech was invited to the Astro-Bluebonnet Bowl, where they lost to Nebraska. The team outscored opponents 336 to 206 and finished the season with the 38th toughest schedule in NCAA Division I.

Previous season
The 1975 team finished with an overall record of 6–5, 4–3 in conference play, finishing in fourth place in the Southwest Conference. The team went 0–5 against teams ranked in the AP Poll. The team was led by Steve Sloan in his inaugural season as the program's eight head coach.

NFL draftees

Schedule

Personnel

Game summaries

No. 15 Texas

vs. No. 13 Nebraska (Astro-Bluebonnet Bowl)

Despite losing the game, Texas Tech quarterback Rodney Allison was named the game's MVP. Nebraska trailed by ten in the second half, coming back to win 27–24. The Red Raiders looked to take the lead back late in the fourth quarter, but lost a fumble that was recovered by Nebraska's Reg Gast to seal the Cornhuskers' victory.

Rankings

Players drafted into the NFL

References

Texas Tech
Texas Tech Red Raiders football seasons
Southwest Conference football champion seasons
Texas Tech Red Raiders football